Mariano Rumor (16 June 1915 – 22 January 1990) was an Italian politician and statesman. A member of the Christian Democracy (DC), he served as the 39th Prime Minister of Italy from December 1968 to August 1970 and again from July 1973 to November 1974. As Prime Minister, he led five different governments, supported by various coalitions.

Rumor served as Minister of Agriculture from 1959 to 1963, Minister of Foreign Affairs from 1974 to 1976, and Minister of the Interior in two brief periods, in 1963 and from 1972 to 1973. Rumor was the DC secretary from 1964 to 1969.

Early life and career
Mariano Rumor was born in Vicenza, Veneto on 16 June 1915. His father, Giuseppe Rumor, was the owner of a typography and promoter of a local magazine, "The Catholic Worker" founded by Rumor's grandfather. His mother, Tina Nardi, came from a liberal family. He attended the classical lyceum Antonio Pigafetta in Vicenza, then he earned a degree from the University of Padua in literature in 1939.

After his graduation, Rumor became a teacher at an Italian lyceum until his mobilization as a lieutenant in the Italian Army during the Second World War. Subsequent to the Armistice of Cassibile in 1943 between Italy and the Allied powers, Rumor joined the Italian resistance movement. After the end of the war, he was among the founders of the Christian Associations of Italian Workers (ACLI), the widespread lay Catholic associations, and joined the Christian Democracy (DC) party, of whom he became one of the main leaders in Veneto, very close to Prime Minister Alcide De Gasperi. In the 1946 election, Rumor was elected with more than 29,000 votes to the Constituent Assembly, for the constituency of Verona–Padova–Vicenza–Rovigo.

He became a member of the new-born Chamber of Deputies in 1948. The 1948 election was heavily influenced by the Cold War confrontation between the Soviet Union and the United States, and are now best known for the covert political warfare waged by the US State Department and Central Intelligence Agency on behalf of the DC. The elections were eventually won with a comfortable margin by De Gasperi's DC that defeated the left-wing coalition of the Popular Democratic Front, that comprised the Italian Communist Party (PCI) and the Italian Socialist Party (PSI). As a deputy he became very close to Giuseppe Dossetti, becoming a member of his Christian leftist wing.

Political career

First roles in government

In 1950, Guido Gonella succeeded Paolo Emilio Taviani as National Secretary of the DC; the target of the new secretariat was to build a unitary management of the party in support of the government led by Alcide De Gasperi. In this context, Rumor was nominated for the first time as National Deputy Secretary, together with Dossetti.

The withdrawal from politics of Giuseppe Dossetti, left his faction without a charismatic leader; however, Mariano Rumor played a decisive role in the birth of the new faction, called "Democratic Initiative", which brought together not only Dossetti's followers, such as Giorgio La Pira, Amintore Fanfani and Aldo Moro, but also members of the centrist pro-De Gasperi majority, as Paolo Emilio Taviani and Oscar Luigi Scalfaro. Rumor himself presented the manifesto of Democratic Initiative, published on a magazine with the same name. In this text, alongside the declaration of support for De Gasperi and the Atlantic Pact, Dossetti's principles of a Christian reformist party were reaffirmed, with the aim of moving the country towards a "democratic evolution".

Rumor immediately played a leading role in the faction. This position, led him to hold the first government posts, becoming Undersecretary for Agriculture in De Gasperi's seventh government, a position he also maintained in De Gasperi VIII Cabinet and, after De Gasperi's retirement in 1954, in the short-lived government led by Giuseppe Pella. In the brief first Fanfani government, from January to February 1954, Rumor was appointed to Secretary of the Council of Ministers.

In 1954, after the National Congress of Naples, which saw the affirmation of Democratic Initiative and the subsequent election of Fanfani as party's Secretary, Rumor was elected again deputy secretary. He held this office for the next five years, until Democratic Initiative split up. In fact, many members of the faction, started criticizing the political line of Fanfani's secretariat, who cautiously began to open to the prospect of a collaboration with Italian Socialist Party (PSI). Prominent members of the faction, including Rumor himself, put the Secretary in minority during the National Congress of March 1959. In this way, Democratic Initiative split up between the followers of Fanfani and the dissident group, now renamed by all Dorotei ("Dorotheans"), from the place where they had gathered before the congress, the convent of the sisters of Santa Dorotea in Rome. The new faction was built around Antonio Segni, Mariano Rumor and Aldo Moro, who was elected new Secretary.

In the same year, as one of the faction's leaders, Rumor was appointed Minister of Agriculture, in the second Segni's government, a position he would keep in the governments of Fernando Tambroni, and Fanfani. In this role, Rumor contributed to the definition of one of the first plans for the development and innovation of the national agricultural sector, the so-called "Green Plan".

In 1963 election, the DC suffered a sharp decline of consensus. Rumor was appointed Minister of the Interior in the short-lived government chaired by Giovanni Leone.

As minister, he had to face one of the most tragic events in Italian republican history, the Vajont Dam disaster. On 9 October 1963, a landslide occurred on Monte Toc, in the province of Pordenone. In the previous months, the Adriatic Society of Electricity (SADE) and the Italian government, which both owned the dam, dismissed evidence and concealed reports describing the geological instability of Monte Toc on the southern side of the basin and other early warning signs reported prior to the disaster.

Immediately after the disaster, government and local authorities insisted on attributing the tragedy to an unexpected and unavoidable natural event. However, numerous warnings, signs of danger, and negative appraisals had been disregarded in the previous months and the eventual attempt to safely control the landslide into the lake by lowering its level came when the landslide was almost imminent and was too late to prevent it. The communist newspaper L'Unità was the first to denounce the actions of management and government.

Secretary of Christian Democracy

In January 1964, Rumor was elected the DC secretary, holding the office until January 1969 and leading the party in a complex phase of government cooperation with the socialists. In the five years leading the DC, Rumor tried to reassure the moderate electorate, in an attempt to recover the consensus lost in the previous elections.

Rumor embodied the typical characteristics of the Dorotheans: caution, moderation, the propensity for mediation rather than for decision, attention to practical and concrete topics, rather than to major strategies, the representation of the interests of the provincial middle class, the privileged link with the public administration, with the Catholic world and with direct farmers. In the general elections of 1968, the DC managed to increase its votes, albeit slightly, gaining 39% of votes. This result was experienced as a success by the Rumor secretariat and he became a natural candidate for the leadership of the government.

First term as Prime Minister
On 13 December 1968, Mariano Rumor was sworn in as Prime Minister for the first time, leading a government composed of Christian Democrats, Socialists and Republicans.

During his first term as Prime Minister, a number of progressive reforms were carried out. A law of 11 December 1969 extended access to higher education to all students holding a higher secondary school diploma. It was formerly limited to students who came from classical, and in some cases, scientific, curricula. A bill, approved on 30 April 1969 introduced broad provisions covering pensions under the general scheme. The multiplying coefficient was increased to 1.85%, applied to average earnings of the best 3 years in the last 5 years of work (maximum pension, after 40 years of contribution: 74% of previous earnings). A social pension was also introduced for people over the age of 65 with low incomes and not eligible for any type of pension. In addition, cost of living indexation for all pensions (with the exception of social pensions) was introduced. A law of 2 February 1970 extended earnings replacement benefits to artisan undertakings in the construction industry.

In foreign policy, Rumor signed, on 28 January 1969, of the Nuclear Non-Proliferation Treaty. However, his first term as Prime Minister was deeply marked by the Piazza Fontana massacre, a terrorist attack that occurred on 12 December 1969 when a bomb exploded at the headquarters of National Agrarian Bank in Piazza Fontana, Milan, killing 17 people and wounding 88. In the same afternoon, three more bombs were detonated in Rome and Milan, and another was found unexploded. The attack was planned by a neo-fascist group, Ordine Nuovo ("New Order"), whose aim was to prevent the country falling into the hands of the left-wing by duping the public into believing the bombings were part of a communist insurgency.

During his first term, Rumor led three different governments. From December 1968 to July 1969, the DC joined with the Italian Socialist Party (PSI) as well as the Italian Republican Party (PRI). Then, from August 1969 to February 1970 he led a DC-only government; its collapse led to a 45-day long period without government, with issues such as Italian divorce law and the status of the Italian Communist Party (PCI) generating instability. After this period, which included an attempt by former Prime Minister Amintore Fanfani to form a government, Rumor led a new coalition with the Socialist, Republican, and Democratic Socialist parties from March until July 1970.

Interior Minister and assassination attempt

In 1972, Rumor was appointed Minister of the Interior, in the government of Giulio Andreotti.

In 1973, Rumor was the target of an assassination attempt, planned by Gianfranco Bertoli, a self-described anarchist. Four were killed during the bombing, and 45 injured, while Rumor escaped alive from it. Bertoli was given a life-term in 1975. Bertoli was an informant of SISMI, the "Military Intelligence and Security Service", at the time. Court proceedings later showed that this connection was one of mistaken identity.

Second term as Prime Minister
After three years under Emilio Colombo and Giulio Andreotti's ministries, Rumor returned to the office of Prime Minister, first leading a coalition composed of Christian Democrats, Socialists, Republicans, and Democratic Socialists from July 1973 to March 1974. After this government collapsed, Rumor formed a new coalition within two weeks, calling upon the Socialists and Democratic Socialists to join with DC from March until October 1974.

During his second term, the Parliament approved a law on 2 March 1974, with which legal minimum for pensions was raised to 27.75% of the average industrial wage for 1973. A law of 16 July 1974 extended family allowances to INPS pensioners, in lieu of child supplements. While a bill of August 1974 extended hospital assistance to all those not previously covered by any scheme.

Weathering a cabinet resignation in June 1974, Rumor's final cabinet would fall in October 1974 after failing to come to an agreement on how to deal with rising economic inflation.

After the premiership

In November 1974, Rumor was appointed Minister of Foreign Affairs in Aldo Moro's fourth cabinet.

During his ministry, he signed the Osimo Treaty with Yugoslavia, defining the official partition of the Free Territory of Trieste. The port city of Trieste with a narrow coastal strip to the north west (Zone A) was given to Italy; a portion of the north-western part of the Istrian peninsula (Zone B) was given to Yugoslavia.

The Italian government was harshly criticized for signing the treaty, particularly for the secretive way in which negotiations were carried out, skipping the traditional diplomatic channels. Italian nationalists of the MSI rejected the idea of giving up Istria, since Istria had been an ancient "Italian" region together with the Venetian region (Venetia et Histria). Furthermore, Istria had belonged to Italy for 25 years between World War I and the end of World War II, and the west coast of Istria had long had a sizeable Italian minority population.

Some nationalist politicians called for the prosecution of Prime Minister Moro and Minister Rumor, for the crime of treason, as stated in Article 241 of the Italian Criminal Code, which mandated a life sentence for anybody found guilty of aiding and abetting a foreign power to exert its sovereignty on the national territory.

The defeat in the 1975 regional elections led to the removal of Amintore Fanfani from the party secretariat. Rumor was proposed by Moro as the new party secretary, but he was vetoed by some members of his own faction. Due to this veto, Rumor abandoned the Dorotheans, approaching the positions of the new secretary Benigno Zaccagnini. Following the Dorotheans' split, Rumor was slowly excluded from relevant positions in the party and in the government.

In 1979, Mariano Rumor was elected in the European Parliament, where he later became Chair of the Political Affairs Committee in 1980, serving in that post until he left the European Parliament in 1984.

Death and legacy

Rumor died of a heart attack in Vicenza on 22 January 1990 at the age of 74.

In the years since his death, Rumor's legacy has been widely debated. The Lockheed bribery scandals, of which Rumor was exonerated by the Italian Parliament, took place under his government and culminated in the trials of two former Defense ministers, Luigi Gui and Mario Tanassi. Rumor was implicated in the scandal after a Lockheed codebook referenced "Antelope Cobbler" as "Prime Minister", which could have been any of Rumor, Aldo Moro, or then-President Giovanni Leone during the relevant time period. While Leone later resigned from the Presidency due to accusations of corruption, none of the three men were ever convicted of being "Antelope Cobbler".

Others have criticized his Presidential Decree No. 1092, a measure which allowed Italian governmental workers to retire after nineteen and a half years of work or fourteen and a half years if they were a woman; such retirees were later termed "baby pensioners" by detractors. The program, instituted in 1973, was terminated in 1992. As of 2014 it was estimated that around half a million pensioners who benefited from the decree were still drawing an average of €1,500 per month.

Personal life
Rumor never married. During all his lifetime and even after his death, speculations arose around his possible homosexuality. However, Rumor had always denied these speculations, which would have ruined his career in a social conservative party like the DC.

Electoral history

References

External links 

 Official website – Senate of the Republic

|-

|-

|-

|-

|-

|-

1915 births
1990 deaths
People from Vicenza
Italian Roman Catholics
Foreign ministers of Italy
Italian Ministers of the Interior
Agriculture ministers of Italy
Christian Democracy (Italy) politicians
20th-century Italian politicians
Prime Ministers of Italy
Politics of Italy